Nathan D. Palmer (born April 14, 1989) is an American football wide receiver who is currently a free agent. He played college football at Northern Illinois.

College career
Palmer attended Northern Illinois University and was named the MVP of the 2011 MAC Championship Game.

Professional career

San Francisco 49ers
Palmer signed as an undrafted free agent, with the San Francisco 49ers following the 2012 NFL Draft. Palmer made the 49ers' practice squad for the 2012 season.

Indianapolis Colts
On September 24, 2012, Palmer was signed by the Indianapolis Colts off of the 49ers' practice squad. He made his debut during the Colts 30-27 comeback win over the Green Bay Packers.
He was waived on August 27, 2013. He was re-signed to the Injured Reserve on August 28, 2013.  He was waived from injured reserve with an injury settlement on September 2, 2013.

Miami Dolphins
On October 30, 2013, Palmer was signed to the Miami Dolphins' practice squad.

Denver Broncos
On December 24, 2013, the Denver Broncos signed Palmer to their practice squad. On September 3, Palmer was promoted to the 53 man roster.

New England Patriots
On September 7, 2015, the New England Patriots signed Palmer to their practice squad. On September 18, 2015, Palmer was released from the practice squad.

Chicago Bears
On October 13, 2015, the Chicago Bears signed Palmer to their practice squad.

On January 4, 2016, Palmer signed a futures contract with the Bears.

Oakland Raiders
Palmer signed with the Raiders on May 24, 2016. On August 29, 2016, he was released by the Raiders.

Singing career
Nathan Palmer is also known as Denver R&B singer "NaPalm." In 2015 he told Denver's News 7 that " football is his love, but music is his life." He has since then released three projects: Winter Vibes and Summer Vibes in 2017, and Therapy in 2018. He has several new singles with Denver hip-hop artists Top Flite Empire.

References

External links
Northern Illinois bio

1989 births
Living people
American football wide receivers
Chicago Bears players
Denver Broncos players
Indianapolis Colts players
Miami Dolphins players
New England Patriots players
Northern Illinois Huskies football players
Oakland Raiders players
People from Elkhart, Indiana
Players of American football from Indiana
San Francisco 49ers players